Marrowbone Township is located in Moultrie County, Illinois. As of the 2010 census, its population was 1,730 and it contained 751 housing units.

History
What is now Marrowbone Twp. was part of Shelby County when first settled in 1828.  Upon establishment of Moultrie County in 1843, the township formed part of Thomason Precinct.  Marrowbone Twp. was established on November 6, 1866, when the County adopted townships as its basic subdivision.

Geography

Demographics

References

External links
City-data.com

Townships in Moultrie County, Illinois
Townships in Illinois